Walterboro is a city in Colleton County, South Carolina, United States. The city's population was 5,398 at the 2010 census. It is the county seat of Colleton County. It is known as "The Front Porch of the Lowcountry".

History

Walterboro (original spelling: "Walterborough") was founded in 1783, as a summer retreat for local planters looking to escape their malaria-ridden, Lowcountry plantations. The original settlement was located on a hilly area, covered with pine and hickory trees and called "Hickory Valley". Two of the earliest settlers were brothers, Paul and Jacob Walter. The brothers were prosperous, plantation owners, in nearby Jacksonboro. Paul's small daughter Mary, was taken ill with malaria; a common disease among the families who had plantations in the marshy areas of the Lowcountry, due to the grounds suitability for rice production. To prevent Mary from succumbing to the deadly microbe, the Walter brothers went looking for a healthier location in which to live during the summer months, and came to settle the town; with it later being named in their honor.

In 1817, Walterboro was designated as the third county seat of Colleton County, and has remained such through present-day. This designation was followed by, the construction of a county courthouse and county jail in 1821. The courthouse was designed by well-known architect, Robert Mills. 

The town quickly spread from the original Hickory Valley location, after its population experienced a significant increase; this being fueled successively by, the town becoming the county seat in 1821, and the establishment of a railroad line that connected the city with Columbia and Charleston in the 1880s.

In 1832, the Irish Catholic community in rural southern Waltersboro (at one point termed Thompson's Crossroads) established a parish called St. James the Greater Catholic Church, dedicated by Bishop John England. The community later was known as "Catholic Hill". After the church was burned down in 1856, and the emancipation of the slaves roughly a decade later, the White community largely left the area. The Black Catholic community maintained their religion for decades without a priest, before a new church was built for them in the 1890s. They became notable in the media in the 21st century, and a documentary on the community was released in 2020.

An airfield was established in the 1930s. In 1942, Walterboro became home to the Walterboro Army Airfield, a sub-base of Columbia Army Air Base, and part of the national network of army air training facilities erected across the U.S. during World War II. The base was established for the purpose of providing advanced air-combat training, to fighter and bomber groups. It also hosted the largest camouflage school in the United States, as well as, a 250-person prisoner of war camp. 

In 1944, the airfield changed command and became an advanced combat training base for individual fighters, primarily the black trainees graduating from Tuskegee Army Airfield in Tuskegee, Alabama. Over 500 of the famed Tuskegee Airmen trained at Walterboro Army Airfield, between April 1944 and October 1945, including individuals training as replacement pilots for the 332nd Fighter-Interceptor Squadron, along with the entire 447th Bombardment Group. The base closed in October 1945, returning to its origins as a local airfield.

The establishment of Interstate 95 in the 1960s, made the town a prime overnight stop on the road to Florida or New York.

Presently, Walterboro is dotted with historic homes dating back to 1820, and a downtown area that has kept many of its historic buildings. The city has become increasingly known as an antiquing destination, and is a popular day-trip from Charleston and Beaufort.

Geography
Walterboro is geographically located slightly north to the center of Colleton County at  (32.904289, −80.666238). Interstate 95 passes west of the city, leading northeast  to Florence, and southwest  to Savannah, Georgia. U.S. Route 17 Alt leads east from US 15,   to Summerville, within the Charleston vicinity, and southwest  to Yemassee. South Carolina Highway 64 leads northwest, past Exit 57 on I-95,  to Ehrhardt, and southeast  to Jacksonboro.

Culture

Rice Festival
The Colleton County Rice Festival is held annually at the end of April, to celebrate the county's history with the rice crop, the staple crop until the American Civil War. Post-Civil war, during the Reconstruction era, rice crops still had an important impact on the county. The 2019 festival was the 44th year it has taken place. Each festival hosts a parade, live music, a pageant, run/walk, along with a cooking contest. The Rice Festival is typically, a two-day event, held on a Friday and Saturday.

Walterboro Wildlife Sanctuary
The Walterboro Wildlife Sanctuary is the largest estuarine sanctuary on the East Coast of the United States.  Made up of hardwood forest and "braided creek" systems, the Sanctuary includes boardwalks, walking trails, bicycle paths, a canoe/kayak trail, observation areas, and a  Discovery Center is currently being built.  Upon completion, the Sanctuary will be the most significant nature-based facility in the lower part of South Carolina. It is open every day from dawn until dusk and is free. It is located on Detreville Street in Walterboro.

The South Carolina Artisans Center
The South Carolina Artisans Center is the official folk art and craft center of the state. Located on Wichman Street in downtown Walterboro, it is open to the public and free of admission charge. It is open to the public, from 9 am to 5 pm, Monday through Saturday; remaining closed only on Sundays.

Other attractions
Colleton Museum & Farmer's Market (East Washington Street)
Walterboro Library Society/Little Library (Wichman/Fishburne Street)
Colleton County Historical & Preservation Society (Church Street)
Old Colleton County Jail (North Jeffries Boulevard)
Old Water Tower (Memorial Ave/Washington Street)
Town Clock (East Washington Street)
Tuskegee Airmen Memorial (Walterboro Army Airfield)
Live Oak Cemetery includes the burial sites of Confederate and Union Army soldiers, a governor, as well as local and state politicians. Tours are offered through the Colleton County Museum

Demographics

2020 census

As of the 2020 United States census, there were 5,544 people, 2,569 households, and 1,265 families residing in the city.

2010 census
As of, the 2010 U.S. census, there were 5,401 people living in the city. The population density was 832.0 people per square mile (401.1/km2). There were 2,571 housing units, at an average density of 475.8 per square mile (183.9/km2). The racial makeup of the city was: 44.1% Non-Hispanic White, 50.5% African American, 0.3% Native American, 1.0% Asian, 0.0% Pacific Islander, and 1.5%  from two or more races. Hispanic or Latino, of any race, constituted 2.9% of the population.

There were 2,231 households, out of which 28.2% had children under the age of 18 years living with them, 39.0% were married couples living together, 23.5% had a female householder with no husband present, and 33.8% were non-families. 30.4% of all households were made up of individuals, and 14.9% had someone living alone who was 65 years of age or older. The average household size was 2.32 and the average family size was 2.90.

In the city, the population was spread out, with 25.8% under the age of 18, 7.5% from 18 to 24, 24.6% from 25 to 44, 23.0% from 45 to 64, and 17.9%  who were 65 years of age or older. The median age was 39 years. For every 100 females, there were 79.7 males. For every 100 females age 18 and over, there were 73.1 males.

The median income for a household in the city was $24,135, and the median income for a family was $32,549. Males had a median income of $27,488 versus $20,351 for females. The per capita income for the city was $20,223. About 20.6% of families and 30.1% of the population were below the poverty line, including 37.1% of those under age 18 and 10.4% of those age 65 or over.

Ethnicity
As of 2016 the largest self-reported ancestries/ethnicities in Walterboro, South Carolina were:

Education
Walterboro is in the Colleton County School District.

Walterboro has several public and private schools in its surrounding area. There are five public elementary schools (Bells Elementary, Cottageville Elementary, Hendersonville Elementary, Forest Hills Elementary, and Northside Elementary, one public middle school (Colleton County Middle School), and one public high school (Colleton County High School). There are two private K-12 schools: Colleton Preparatory Academy and North Walterboro Christian Academy. The University of South Carolina Salkehatchie is the city's local university and Clemson University has a county extension office in the city.

Walterboro has a public library branch of the Colleton County Library System.

Notable people

William Jones Boone, first Episcopal bishop of Shanghai
Bonnie Lynn Fields, actress
Norman Hand, NFL defensive tackle
Craig Mack, hip hop artist
Peden McLeod, attorney and politician
Dean Meminger, basketball player and coach
John Peurifoy, diplomat
Mary Shaffer, artist
Young Scooter, hip hop artist
Marvin Herman Shoob, United States federal court judge
Darwin Walker, NFL defensive tackle
Bill Workman, former town manager and economic development consultant; mayor of Greenville, South Carolina, 1983–1995
Kamiyah Mobley

Infrastructure
Walterboro is accessible from Interstate 95 (access at exits 53 and 57), where lodging, dining, and gas station facilities make it a popular stopping point for travelers. Other roads of importance include U.S. Highway 15, Alternate U.S. Highway 17, and several state highways.  The Lowcountry Regional Airport provides general aviation services to Walterboro and Colleton County.

References

External links
 City of Walterboro official website
 Rice Festival
 Great Swamp Sanctuary
 South Carolina Artisan Center

Cities in South Carolina
Cities in Colleton County, South Carolina
County seats in South Carolina
Populated places established in 1783
1783 establishments in South Carolina